Manganese disulfide is a rare substance found in the form of the mineral hauerite.

References

Manganese minerals